Dalya (formerly Arbil) was a mobile virtual network operator service based in London in the United Kingdom that specialised in low-cost calls to the Middle East.

It is now in liquidation.

References

 

Mobile phone companies of the United Kingdom
Mobile virtual network operators